The St. Raphael was a Fokker F.VIIa monoplane that was used in 1927 for a transatlantic flight from England to Canada in an attempt to be the first to cross from east to west. With the owner and financial backer Princess Anne of Löwenstein-Wertheim-Freudenberg as a passenger, the aircraft departed RAF Upavon, Wiltshire, at 7:30 on 31 August 1927 with Frederick F. Minchin and Leslie Hamilton as flight crew.
After a number of unconfirmed reports the aircraft and occupants were never seen again.

See also
 List of missing aircraft
 Old Glory

References

Individual aircraft
Missing aircraft